Anis al-Naqqash (1951 – 22 February 2021), also known as Naccache, was a Lebanese political activist and  revolutionary. He was also known for being a Lebanese guerrilla fighter.

Biography
Al-Naqqash was born into a Sunni Beiruti family but later converted to Shia Islam after having pledged allegiance to Ruhollah Khomeini following the success of the Iranian Revolution in February 1979.

In 1968, he joined Fatah Movement and had several missions in Lebanon, Palestine and Europe, then he became among the first operatives during the 1978 South Lebanon conflict. In 1975, he was part of a six-person team led by Venezuelan guerrilla fighter Carlos the Jackal, which perpetrated the OPEC siege in Vienna, Austria.

In 1980, Anis al-Naqqash was accused of being involved in a failed assassination attempt on the last Prime Minister of Iran under Pahlavi monarchy, Shapour Bakhtiar, in a court in Paris and was sentenced to life in prison. The assassination attempt resulted in death of a police officer and a civilian. Al-Naqqash was freed on 27 July 1990, together with four accomplices, after being pardoned by President François Mitterrand.

Death
He died from COVID-19 at a hospital in Damascus on 22 February 2021, at age 70, during the COVID-19 pandemic in Syria.

References 

1951 births
2021 deaths
People from Beirut
Converts to Shia Islam from Sunni Islam
Lebanese people imprisoned abroad
Lebanese prisoners sentenced to life imprisonment
Prisoners sentenced to life imprisonment by France
Recipients of French presidential pardons
Deaths from the COVID-19 pandemic in Syria

Guerrillas
Political activists